Ira Noel Gabrielson (September 27, 1889 – September 7, 1977) was an American naturalist and [ornithologist]

Personal life
Ira Gabrielson was born on September 27, 1889, in Sioux Rapids, Iowa, in which he attended and later graduated from Morningside College, in 1912.

Gabrielson died of heart complications, on September 7, 1977, while living in Virginia. He was 87 years old.

Career 
He taught biology for a short  period of time at Marshalltown High School in Marshalltown, Iowa. After that, he joined the Bureau of Biological Survey.

He became a director of the US Fish and Wildlife Service, before which he served as chief of the old Bureau of Biological Survey of the Agriculture Department. In 1940, when Biological Survey and the Bureau of Fisheries united into the Fish and Wildlife Service, he became a director, and stayed as such until 1946. During that time he served as a deputy coordinator of fisheries and a U.S. delegate to the International Whaling Conference, and had responsibility for adding millions of acres to the National Wildlife Refuge System. In 1946 he retired from the federal government, and became the president of the Wildlife Management Institute. He served there until 1970, after which he became the chairman of the board. From 1959 to 1976, he was a chairman of the Northern Virginia Regional Park Authority. He was called upon by the governor to the Virginia Outdoor Study Commission, in 1966, during which year he drafted a plan on how to conserve and develop the state's natural resources. In 1975, he and his colleagues were chosen by the American Forestry Association as one of the selected groups for the National Hall of Conservation. He wrote four books and coauthored six others, all of which were on birds and conservation. He joined expeditions to the Andes, the Amazon, Europe, the Mediterranean, South Pole, and Alaska, all in the name of birds. He was a member of the Audubon Society and was awarded the Audubon Medal in 1949. He also has an award from the Interior Department's Distinguished Service Award. During his lifetime, he also was a member of the American Ornithologists Union, the Ecology Society of America, the Izaak Walton League, Society of Systematic Zoology, Washington Academy of Sciences and the Cosmos Club.

References

American ornithologists
1889 births
1977 deaths
American entomologists
People from Buena Vista County, Iowa
Recipients of the Department of the Interior's Distinguished Service Award
20th-century American zoologists